Molly Brigid O'Bryan Vandemoer (born April 13, 1979) is an American sailor who competed in the 2012 Summer Olympics in the Elliott 6m class with Anna Tunnicliffe and Deborah Capozzi coming 5th overall.  With Tunnicliffe and Capozzi, she also won the World title in 2011 and came second in 2012.

Previously, she was a High School National Champion, and competed with the University of Hawaiʻi at Mānoa sailing team, where she was the captain of the women's and co-ed teams, was named three-times ICSA All-American skipper, and won the ICSA Women's Dinghy National Championship in 2001. She was awarded the Wayne Kight Memorial Trophy in 2001.

She also won, with Anna Tunnicliffe, the Women's Snipe World Championships in 2010.

She is currently the director of the Peninsula Youth Sailing Foundation (PYSF).

References

External links
 
 
 
 
 

1979 births
Living people
American female sailors (sport)
Olympic sailors of the United States
Sailors at the 2012 Summer Olympics – Elliott 6m
Snipe class female world champions
World champions in sailing for the United States
Hawaii Rainbow Warriors and Rainbow Wahine sailors
21st-century American women